Fluxology is the debut album by dobro player Jerry Douglas, released in 1979 (see 1979 in music). The album's title comes from Douglas's nickname of "Flux."

Fluxology is out of print although most of the tracks can be found on the compilation Everything Is Gonna Work Out Fine.

Track listing
 "Fluxology" (Jerry Douglas) – 3:06
 "Bill Cheatham" (Traditional) – 3:03
 "Say a Little Prayer for You" (Burt Bacharach, Hal David) – 4:11
 "C-Biscuit" (Douglas) – 3:30
 "Randy Lynn Rag" (Earl Scruggs) – 2:19
 "Wheel Hoss" (Bill Monroe) – 2:24
 "Red Bud Rag" (Douglas) – 2:59
 "Alabam" – 2:53
 "Dixie Hoedown" (Jimmy Lunsford, Don Reno) – 1:53
 "Blues for Vickie" (Douglas) – 1:02

Personnel
Darol Anger – fiddle
Terry Baucom – fiddle
Steve "Hood" Bryant – bass
J. D. Crowe – banjo
Jerry Douglas – dobro
Wes Golding – guitar
Jack Hicks – banjo
Todd Phillips – bass 
Tony Rice – guitar
Ricky Skaggs – mandolin, fiddle
Bobby Slone – bass
Buck White – piano

References

1979 debut albums
Jerry Douglas albums
Rounder Records albums